Brianna Alexis Smalls Pinto (born May 24, 2000) is an American soccer player who currently plays as a midfielder for North Carolina Courage of the National Women's Soccer League (NWSL).

Pinto has played for the United States youth national teams at the 2016 FIFA U-17 Women's World Cup and the 2018 FIFA U-20 Women's World Cup and was named the United States Soccer Federation's Young Female Player of the Year in 2019. At age 16, Pinto was the youngest player named to the United States women's team's squad for the 2017 SheBelieves Cup.

Early life
Pinto was born in New Haven, Connecticut and grew up in Durham, North Carolina. At age 9, her father Hassan, who played for North Carolina's men's soccer team, placed her on the boys team at Triangle FC in Raleigh, North Carolina after contacting former North Carolina women's players, Mia Hamm, Kristine Lilly and Cindy Parlow, who told him they developed at an early age by playing against boys. At age 13, she joined Capital Area Soccer League (CASL) ECNL, also in Raleigh, playing there from 2014 to 2017, before joining NTH Tophat in Atlanta in 2018.

College career
Anson Dorrance, head coach of the University of North Carolina women's team, who had recruited her father Hassan when he also coached the men's team, began recruiting Pinto when she was in eighth grade. She accepted the offer in ninth grade. Pinto made her college debut in August 2018 and scored the opening goal in a 2–0 win against Ohio State, the 1,000th win of Dorrance's career.

In 2019, her sophomore season, she was named First-Team All-American by United Soccer Coaches along with teammates Alessia Russo and Emily Fox, and helped the Tar Heels reach the 2019 College Cup Final. She was a First-Team All-ACC selection during all three years at North Carolina.

In the 2020 season (extended into Spring 2021 because of the COVID-19 pandemic), Pinto helped North Carolina reach the semifinal of the NCAA Tournament, where she scored a goal in the Tar Heels' 1–3 loss to Santa Clara. She was named First-Team All America for the second straight year and one of the three women's finalists for Hermann Trophy, given to the best collegiate soccer player of the season by the Missouri Athletic Club.

Club career
In January 2021, Pinto announced she was entering the 2021 NWSL Draft, although she planned to finish her junior season at North Carolina, with the 2020 NCAA Division I Women's Soccer Tournament moved to Spring 2021 due to the COVID-19 pandemic. NJ/NY Gotham FC chose her in the first round of the draft, making her the third overall pick.

On June 4, 2021, Pinto signed a two-year contract with NJ/NY Gotham FC. She made her professional debut on June 20, 2021, as a substitute against Orlando Pride.

On December 6, 2021, Pinto was traded to the North Carolina Courage.

On March 19, 2022, Pinto scored her first professional goal in a NWSL Challenge Cup match against NJ/NY Gotham FC, making the score 1-0. On May 18, 2022, Pinto scored her first career NWSL regular season goal in a match against Orlando Pride, making the score 2-1 Orlando.

International career
Pinto has been with the United States women's national soccer team program since age 12, when she was invited to the youth national team Under-14 talent identification camp. She played for the United States U-17 team at the 2016 FIFA U-17 Women's World Cup and was two years younger than the cutoff age at the 2018 FIFA U-20 Women's World Cup for the United States U-20 team. Pinto played in every match at both tournaments.

Pinto received her first senior national team callup in January 2017, and at age 16, she was the youngest player named to the United States' squad for the 2017 SheBelieves Cup, although she did not make an appearance in the tournament.

Personal life
In 2018, Pinto, along with Alphonso Davies of Canada and Diego Lainez of Mexico, spoke before the 68th FIFA Congress to present North America's bid to host the 2026 FIFA World Cup.

In October 2020, Pinto, along with four other young athletes who called themselves Next Gen United, ran for and won seats on United States Soccer Federation's 20-person Athlete's Council, with the stated aim of diversifying the federation's leadership in age and culture. Prior to the election, the council had no Black members and just one person born after 1990.

Both her parents attended the University of North Carolina in the early 1990s. Her father, Hassan, played for the men's soccer team and her mother, Meleata, played softball. Her older brother, Hassan, Jr., played soccer at Elon University and Duke University and is a right back for Loudoun United FC in the USL Championship, and Malik, her younger brother, plays soccer at Princeton University.

See also
 List of University of North Carolina at Chapel Hill alumni

References

External links
 North Carolina Tar Heels bio

2000 births
Living people
American women's soccer players
North Carolina Tar Heels women's soccer players
African-American women's soccer players
Soccer players from North Carolina
Soccer players from Connecticut
Sportspeople from New Haven, Connecticut
Sportspeople from Durham, North Carolina
NJ/NY Gotham FC draft picks
NJ/NY Gotham FC players
United States Soccer Federation officials
Women's association football midfielders
United States women's under-20 international soccer players
21st-century African-American sportspeople
20th-century African-American sportspeople
National Women's Soccer League players
20th-century African-American women
21st-century African-American women
North Carolina Courage players